Norman Moses Clapp (October 28, 1914 – October 7, 1998) served as the Administrator of the Rural Electrification Administration in the Administrations of Presidents Kennedy and Johnson. Clapp also directed New York State's investigation of a July 1977 power blackout. He was a graduate of Lawrence University. Clapp served as Wisconsin's transportation secretary and chairman of the Public Service Commission in the 1970s.

References

United States Department of Agriculture officials
1914 births
1998 deaths
People from Ellsworth, Wisconsin
Lawrence University alumni